
Gmina Lipie is a rural gmina (administrative district) in Kłobuck County, Silesian Voivodeship, in southern Poland.

Villages
Gmina Lipie contains the villages and settlements of Albertów, Brzózki, Chałków, Danków, Giętkowizna, Grabarze, Julianów, Kleśniska, Lindów, Lipie, Napoleon, Natolin, Parzymiechy, Rębielice Szlacheckie, Rozalin, Stanisławów, Szyszków, Troniny, Wapiennik, Zbrojewsko and Zimnowoda.

Neighbouring gminas
Gmina Lipie is bordered by the gminas of Działoszyn, Krzepice, Opatów, Pątnów, Popów and Rudniki.

References

Lipie
Kłobuck County